Ocaqlı (also, Odzhagly and Odzhakhly) is a village and municipality in the Jalilabad Rayon of Azerbaijan. It has a population of 4,027.

References 

Populated places in Jalilabad District (Azerbaijan)